The following species in the flowering plant genus Mimosa are accepted by Plants of the World Online. About 90% of its hundreds of species are found in the Neotropics.

Mimosa acantholoba 
Mimosa acapulcensis 
Mimosa accedens 
Mimosa acroconica 
Mimosa aculeaticarpa 
Mimosa acutistipula 
Mimosa adamantina 
Mimosa adenantheroides 
Mimosa adenocarpa 
Mimosa adenotricha 
Mimosa adpressa 
Mimosa affinis 
Mimosa aguapeia 
Mimosa albida 
Mimosa albolanata 
Mimosa alleniana 
Mimosa altoparanensis 
Mimosa amambayensis 
Mimosa amnis-atri 
Mimosa andina 
Mimosa andringitrensis 
Mimosa annularis 
Mimosa antioquensis 
Mimosa antrorsa 
Mimosa apodocarpa 
Mimosa arenosa 
Mimosa arturoana 
Mimosa aspera 
Mimosa asperoides 
Mimosa atlantica 
Mimosa aureliana 
Mimosa auriberbis 
Mimosa auriculata 
Mimosa aurivillus 
Mimosa australis 
Mimosa axillarioides 
Mimosa axillaris 
Mimosa bahamensis 
Mimosa balansae 
Mimosa balduinii 
Mimosa baptistae 
Mimosa barberi 
Mimosa barnebiana 
Mimosa barrancana 
Mimosa barretoi 
Mimosa bathyrrhena 
Mimosa benthamii 
Mimosa berroi 
Mimosa bifurca 
Mimosa bimucronata 
Mimosa bipennatula 
Mimosa bispiculata 
Mimosa biuncifera 
Mimosa blanchetii 
Mimosa bocainae 
Mimosa boliviana 
Mimosa bombycina 
Mimosa bonplandii 
Mimosa borboremae 
Mimosa borealis 
Mimosa brachycarpa 
Mimosa brachycarpoides 
Mimosa brachystachya 
Mimosa bracteolaris 
Mimosa brevipes 
Mimosa brevipetiolata 
Mimosa brevipinna 
Mimosa brevispicata 
Mimosa burchellii 
Mimosa burkartii 
Mimosa busseana 
Mimosa caaguazuensis 
Mimosa caccavariana 
Mimosa caduca 
Mimosa caerulea 
Mimosa caesalpiniifolia 
Mimosa cainguensis 
Mimosa calcicola 
Mimosa caliciadenia 
Mimosa calliandroides 
Mimosa callidryas 
Mimosa callithrix 
Mimosa calocephala 
Mimosa calodendron 
Mimosa campicola 
Mimosa camporum 
Mimosa canahuensis 
Mimosa canastrensis 
Mimosa candelabrum 
Mimosa candollei 
Mimosa capito 
Mimosa capuronii 
Mimosa carolina 
Mimosa carvalhoi 
Mimosa casta 
Mimosa castanoclada 
Mimosa catharinensis 
Mimosa centurionis 
Mimosa ceratonia 
Mimosa cerifera 
Mimosa chacoensis 
Mimosa chaetosphaera 
Mimosa chartostegia 
Mimosa chelata 
Mimosa chiliomera 
Mimosa chiquitaniensis 
Mimosa chochisensis 
Mimosa chodatii 
Mimosa chrysastra 
Mimosa chrysothrix 
Mimosa cisparanensis 
Mimosa claussenii 
Mimosa coelocarpa 
Mimosa colombiana 
Mimosa congestifolia 
Mimosa coniflora 
Mimosa cordistipula 
Mimosa cordobensis 
Mimosa coruscocaesia 
Mimosa corynadenia 
Mimosa costenya 
Mimosa craspedisetosa 
Mimosa cruenta 
Mimosa crumenarioides 
Mimosa cryptogloea 
Mimosa cryptothamnos 
Mimosa ctenodes 
Mimosa cubatanensis 
Mimosa cuiabensis 
Mimosa custodis 
Mimosa cuzcoana 
Mimosa cyclophylla 
Mimosa cylindracea 
Mimosa daleoides 
Mimosa dalyi 
Mimosa dasilvae 
Mimosa dasyphylla 
Mimosa deamii 
Mimosa debilis 
Mimosa deceptrix 
Mimosa decorticans 
Mimosa decumbens 
Mimosa delicatula 
Mimosa demissa 
Mimosa densa 
Mimosa depauperata 
Mimosa detinens 
Mimosa dicerastes 
Mimosa dichroa 
Mimosa diffusa 
Mimosa digitata 
Mimosa diminuta 
Mimosa diplacantha 
Mimosa diplotricha 
Mimosa discobola 
Mimosa disperma 
Mimosa distachya 
Mimosa distans 
Mimosa diversifolia 
Mimosa diversipila 
Mimosa dolens 
Mimosa dominarum 
Mimosa domingensis 
Mimosa dormiens 
Mimosa dryandroides 
Mimosa dumetaria 
Mimosa dupuyana 
Mimosa dutrae 
Mimosa dysocarpa 
Mimosa echinocaula 
Mimosa egregia 
Mimosa ekmanii 
Mimosa elliptica 
Mimosa emoryana 
Mimosa ephedroides 
Mimosa epitropica 
Mimosa equisetum 
Mimosa eriocarpa 
Mimosa eriorrhachis 
Mimosa ernestii 
Mimosa ervendbergii 
Mimosa eurystegia 
Mimosa exalbescens 
Mimosa excedentis 
Mimosa extensa 
Mimosa extranea 
Mimosa fachinalensis 
Mimosa fagaracantha 
Mimosa falcipinna 
Mimosa falconis 
Mimosa farinosa 
Mimosa fernandez-casasii 
Mimosa fiebrigii 
Mimosa filipes 
Mimosa filipetiola 
Mimosa flabellifolia 
Mimosa flagellaris 
Mimosa flavocaesia 
Mimosa flocculosa 
Mimosa floridana 
Mimosa foliolosa 
Mimosa foreroana 
Mimosa furfuracea 
Mimosa galeottii 
Mimosa gardneri 
Mimosa gatesiae 
Mimosa gemmulata 
Mimosa gentryi 
Mimosa glabra 
Mimosa glanduliseta 
Mimosa glaucula 
Mimosa glaziovii 
Mimosa glutinosa 
Mimosa glycyrrhizoides 
Mimosa goldmanii 
Mimosa gracilis 
Mimosa grahamii 
Mimosa grandidieri 
Mimosa granitica 
Mimosa guanchezii 
Mimosa guaranitica 
Mimosa guatemalensis 
Mimosa guaviarensis 
Mimosa guilandinae 
Mimosa guirocobensis 
Mimosa gymnas 
Mimosa haavoa 
Mimosa hafomantsina 
Mimosa hamata 
Mimosa hapaloclada 
Mimosa hatschbachii 
Mimosa hebecarpa 
Mimosa heringeri 
Mimosa hexandra 
Mimosa hilariana 
Mimosa hildebrandtii 
Mimosa hirsuticaulis 
Mimosa hirsutissima 
Mimosa hondurana 
Mimosa honesta 
Mimosa hortensis 
Mimosa huanchacae 
Mimosa huberi 
Mimosa humifusa 
Mimosa humivagans 
Mimosa hypnodes 
Mimosa hypoglauca 
Mimosa hystricina 
Mimosa ikondensis 
Mimosa implexa 
Mimosa inamoena 
Mimosa incana 
Mimosa incarum 
Mimosa insidiosa 
Mimosa insignis 
Mimosa interrupta 
Mimosa intricata 
Mimosa invisa 
Mimosa involucrata 
Mimosa iperoensis 
Mimosa irrigua 
Mimosa irwinii 
Mimosa itatiaiensis 
Mimosa jacobita 
Mimosa jaenensis 
Mimosa josephina 
Mimosa kalunga 
Mimosa kermesina 
Mimosa kitrokala 
Mimosa kuhlmannii 
Mimosa kuhnisteroides 
Mimosa lacerata 
Mimosa lactiflua 
Mimosa lamolina 
Mimosa lanata 
Mimosa laniceps 
Mimosa lanuginosa 
Mimosa lasiocephala 
Mimosa laticifera 
Mimosa latidens 
Mimosa latispinosa 
Mimosa lawranceana 
Mimosa leimonias 
Mimosa leiocephala 
Mimosa lemniscata 
Mimosa leonardii 
Mimosa lepidophora 
Mimosa lepidorepens 
Mimosa lepidota 
Mimosa leprosa 
Mimosa leptantha 
Mimosa leptocarpa 
Mimosa leptorhachis 
Mimosa leucaenoides 
Mimosa levenensis 
Mimosa lewisii 
Mimosa lingvatouana 
Mimosa lithoreas 
Mimosa longepedunculata 
Mimosa longipes 
Mimosa longiracemosa 
Mimosa longistipula 
Mimosa loxensis 
Mimosa luciana 
Mimosa luisana 
Mimosa lundiana 
Mimosa lupinoides 
Mimosa macedoana 
Mimosa macrocalyx 
Mimosa macrocephala 
Mimosa macropogon 
Mimosa magentea 
Mimosa maguirei 
Mimosa mahilakensis 
Mimosa mainaea 
Mimosa malacophylla 
Mimosa manidea 
Mimosa manomboensis 
Mimosa maracayuensis 
Mimosa margaritae 
Mimosa martin-delcampoi 
Mimosa medioxima 
Mimosa melanocarpa 
Mimosa mellii 
Mimosa menabeensis 
Mimosa mensicola 
Mimosa microcarpa 
Mimosa microcephala 
Mimosa micropteris 
Mimosa minarum 
Mimosa minutifolia 
Mimosa miranda 
Mimosa misera 
Mimosa mitzi 
Mimosa modesta 
Mimosa mollis 
Mimosa monacensis 
Mimosa monancistra 
Mimosa monclovensis 
Mimosa moniliformis 
Mimosa montana 
Mimosa monticola 
Mimosa montis-carasae 
Mimosa morongii 
Mimosa morroensis 
Mimosa mossambicensis 
Mimosa multiceps 
Mimosa multiplex 
Mimosa murex 
Mimosa myriacantha 
Mimosa myriadenia 
Mimosa myriocephala 
Mimosa myrioglandulosa 
Mimosa myriophylla 
Mimosa myuros 
Mimosa nanchititlana 
Mimosa neonitens 
Mimosa neptunioides 
Mimosa niederleinii 
Mimosa niomarlei 
Mimosa nitens 
Mimosa nitidula 
Mimosa nossibiensis 
Mimosa nothacacia 
Mimosa nothopteris 
Mimosa nycteridis 
Mimosa oblonga 
Mimosa obstrigosa 
Mimosa occidentalis 
Mimosa oedoclada 
Mimosa oligophylla 
Mimosa oligosperma 
Mimosa onilahensis 
Mimosa ophthalmocentra 
Mimosa orbignyana 
Mimosa orinocoensis 
Mimosa orthacantha 
Mimosa orthocarpa 
Mimosa osmarii 
Mimosa ostenii 
Mimosa ourobrancoensis 
Mimosa pabstiana 
Mimosa pachycarpoides 
Mimosa palmeri 
Mimosa palmetorum 
Mimosa paludosa 
Mimosa papposa 
Mimosa paraguariae 
Mimosa paraibana 
Mimosa paranapiacabae 
Mimosa parviceps 
Mimosa parvifoliolata 
Mimosa parvipinna 
Mimosa paucifolia 
Mimosa pauli 
Mimosa paupera 
Mimosa pectinatipinna 
Mimosa pedersenii 
Mimosa peduncularis 
Mimosa pedunculosa 
Mimosa per-dusenii 
Mimosa perplicata 
Mimosa petiolaris 
Mimosa petraea 
Mimosa phyllodinea 
Mimosa pigra 
Mimosa pilulifera 
Mimosa pinetorum 
Mimosa piptoptera 
Mimosa piresii 
Mimosa piscatorum 
Mimosa pithecolobioides 
Mimosa planitei 
Mimosa platycarpa 
Mimosa platyphylla 
Mimosa plumosa 
Mimosa poculata 
Mimosa pogocephala 
Mimosa pogonoclada 
Mimosa polyantha 
Mimosa polycarpa 
Mimosa polycephala 
Mimosa polydactyla 
Mimosa polydidyma 
Mimosa porrecta 
Mimosa prainiana 
Mimosa pratincola 
Mimosa pringlei 
Mimosa prionopus 
Mimosa procurrens 
Mimosa prorepens 
Mimosa pseudocallosa 
Mimosa pseudofoliolosa 
Mimosa pseudolepidota 
Mimosa pseudopetiolaris 
Mimosa pseudoradula 
Mimosa pseudosepiaria 
Mimosa pseudotrachycarpa 
Mimosa psilocarpa 
Mimosa psittacina 
Mimosa psoralea 
Mimosa pteridifolia 
Mimosa puberula 
Mimosa pudica 
Mimosa pumilio 
Mimosa purpusii 
Mimosa pusilliceps 
Mimosa pycnocoma 
Mimosa pyrenea 
Mimosa quadrivalvis 
Mimosa quitensis 
Mimosa radula 
Mimosa ramboi 
Mimosa ramentacea 
Mimosa ramosissima 
Mimosa ramulosa 
Mimosa rastrera 
Mimosa rava 
Mimosa reduviosa 
Mimosa regina 
Mimosa regnellii 
Mimosa reptans 
Mimosa revoluta 
Mimosa rheiptera 
Mimosa rhodocarpa 
Mimosa rhododactyla 
Mimosa rhodostegia 
Mimosa riedelii 
Mimosa riverensis 
Mimosa robusta 
Mimosa rocae 
Mimosa rojasii 
Mimosa rokatavensis 
Mimosa rondoniana 
Mimosa rosei 
Mimosa roseoalba 
Mimosa rubicaulis 
Mimosa rubra 
Mimosa rufescens 
Mimosa rufipila 
Mimosa rupestris 
Mimosa rupigena 
Mimosa rusbyana 
Mimosa sanguinolenta 
Mimosa savokaea 
Mimosa scaberrima 
Mimosa scabrella 
Mimosa sceptrum 
Mimosa schininii 
Mimosa schleidenii 
Mimosa schomburgkii 
Mimosa schrankioides 
Mimosa selloi 
Mimosa sensibilis 
Mimosa sensitiva 
Mimosa sericantha 
Mimosa serpensetosa 
Mimosa serra 
Mimosa setifera 
Mimosa setistipula 
Mimosa setosa 
Mimosa setosissima 
Mimosa setuligera 
Mimosa setuliseta 
Mimosa sicyocarpa 
Mimosa similis 
Mimosa simplicissima 
Mimosa sinaloensis 
Mimosa skinneri 
Mimosa sobralii 
Mimosa somnambulans 
Mimosa somnians 
Mimosa sotoi 
Mimosa sousae 
Mimosa sparsa 
Mimosa sparsiformis 
Mimosa speciosissima 
Mimosa spirocarpa 
Mimosa spixiana 
Mimosa splendida 
Mimosa sprengelii 
Mimosa strigillosa 
Mimosa strobiliflora 
Mimosa struthionoptera 
Mimosa stylosa 
Mimosa subenervis 
Mimosa suberosa 
Mimosa subinermis 
Mimosa suburbana 
Mimosa suffruticosa 
Mimosa supravisa 
Mimosa surumuensis 
Mimosa taimbensis 
Mimosa tanalarum 
Mimosa tandilensis 
Mimosa tarda 
Mimosa tejupilcana 
Mimosa teledactyla 
Mimosa tenuiflora 
Mimosa tenuipendula 
Mimosa tequilana 
Mimosa terribilis 
Mimosa tetragona 
Mimosa texana 
Mimosa thermarum 
Mimosa thomista 
Mimosa tobatiensis 
Mimosa tocantina 
Mimosa torresiae 
Mimosa townsendii 
Mimosa trianae 
Mimosa tricephala 
Mimosa trichocephala 
Mimosa trinerva 
Mimosa troncosoae 
Mimosa tucumensis 
Mimosa turneri 
Mimosa tweedieana 
Mimosa ulbrichiana 
Mimosa ulei 
Mimosa uliginosa 
Mimosa uniceps 
Mimosa uninervis 
Mimosa unipinnata 
Mimosa uraguensis 
Mimosa urandiensis 
Mimosa urbica 
Mimosa uribeana 
Mimosa ursina 
Mimosa urticaria 
Mimosa velloziana 
Mimosa venatorum 
Mimosa verecunda 
Mimosa verrucosa 
Mimosa vestita 
Mimosa vexans 
Mimosa vilersii 
Mimosa viperina 
Mimosa virgula 
Mimosa viva 
Mimosa volubilis 
Mimosa waterlotii 
Mimosa watsonii 
Mimosa weberbaueri 
Mimosa weddelliana 
Mimosa widgrenii 
Mimosa williamsii 
Mimosa woodii 
Mimosa xanthocentra 
Mimosa xiquexiquensis 
Mimosa xochipalensis 
Mimosa zimapanensis 
Mimosa zygophylla

References

Mimosa